Didier Diderot (14 September 1685 in Langres – 3 June 1759 ibid) was a French craftsman and the father of the encyclopedist, author, philosopher of enlightenment Denis Diderot.

Biography 
Didier Diderot descended from  families of  local  craftsmen from the city of Langres, Champagne. 
His father, Denis Diderot (1654–1726), senior, was a master craftsman, or rather a knife forgemaster, maître coutelier, and his mother was Nicole Beligné (1655–1692). 
On 20 June 1679 both had married.  Nicole Beligné was born on 1655 as the daughter of a wealthy artisan family. Her father was François Beligné (1625–1697)  who was also knife blacksmith, her mother was Catherine Grassot.  From his father-in-law Beligné Denis Diderot adopted the labeling of their own products: a pearl, la perle.
Didier (compare also Desiderius of Langres) had five brothers - Didier was the second son - and one sister; by order of birth year, the Diderot children are as follows:
Antoine Thomas (1682–1755);
Didier (1685-1769);
Claude (1687–1689);
François (born 1688);
Felix (born 1689);
Catherine Diderot (born 1690).  

Didier Diderot married on 19 January 1712 in Chassigny  Angélique Vigneron (12 October 1677 – 1 October 1748). She was the daughter of the tanner, tanneur  François Vigneron (died in 1679) and Jeanne Aramite Humblot (died in 1710) from Langres.
Didier Diderot was close to the Jansenism. Later they had three sons and four daughters, one son died shortly after his birth in 1712, followed by Denis (1713–1784) and Didier-Pierre (1722–1787), the canon of Langres, Langres chanoine écrivain (see also Roman Catholic Diocese of Langres) and the sisters Denise (1715–1797), Catherine (1716–1718), Catherine (born 1719) and Angélique Diderot (born 1720). Angélique Diderot joined the ursulines. 

The family lived around the year 1713 in the center of Langres, Place Chambeau today the n ° 9 de la place dans le center ville de Langres, a place that now bears the name of Denis Diderot.

Didier Diderot was a specialist in the manufacture of medical and surgical cutting instruments, and his lancets were sought after by teaching doctors.

Selected writing 

 Diderot, Didier; Marcel, Louis: Une lettre du père de Diderot à son fils, détenu à Vincennes (3 septembre 1749). J. Bière, Bordeaux, (1928)

Further reading 

 Gautier, Hubert: Le père de Diderot (1685–1759), son testament, sa succession, patrimoine d'un maître coutelier langrois vers le milieu du XVIIIe siècle. Moulins, Crépin-Leblond, (1933).
 Beligné, Henri: Les couteliers de Langres et de Nogent sous la Révolution. In Bulletin de la société historique et archéologique de Langres. n°313, tome XXI, trimestriel IV, (1993)
 Bouet, Janine: Les couteliers Langrois au XVIIIe. D.E.S, faculté des lettres de Dijon, (1966)
 Jean-Jacques Perret: L'Art du Coutelier expert en instruments de Chirurgie. Seconde Partie de l'Art du Coutelier. Premiere section. Jean Desaint & Charles Saillant, Parigi (1772)
 Société historique et archéologique de Langres: L'art de la coutellerie au pays de Langres et de Nogent: maîtres couteliers orfèvres et graveurs de Langres et de Nogent. Exposition Langres, Société historique et archéologique. Musée du Breuil-de-Saint-Germain, (1966)
 Furbank, Philip Nicholas: Diderot. A critical biography. Secker & Warburg, London (1992)

References

External links 
 Souviron, Marie: Diderot, Langres et la religion. Recherches sur Diderot et sur l'Encyclopédie Année 1988 Volume 4 Numéro 4 S. 7-36 online
 Diderot à Langres. Villes et Pays d’art et d’histoire Langres Villes et Pays d’art et d’histoire Langres.
 Pierre BÉLIGNÉ coutelier du Roi à Langres
 Portrait of Denise Diderot (1715–1797) Musee du Breuil-de-St.-Germain (France)

French blacksmiths
1685 births
1759 deaths
People from Langres
Denis Diderot
French male writers